Elections to the municipal council of Cabacés, Tarragona province, Spain.

May 2003

June 1999

May 1995

May 1991

External links
Source: 

Municipal elections in Spain